Populus tremula (commonly called aspen, common aspen, Eurasian aspen, European aspen, or quaking aspen) is a species of poplar native to cool temperate regions of Europe and Asia, from Iceland and the British Isles east to Kamchatka, north to inside the Arctic Circle in Scandinavia and northern Russia, and south to central Spain, Turkey, the Tian Shan, North Korea, and northern Japan. It also occurs at one site in northwest Africa in Algeria. In the south of its range, it occurs at high altitudes in mountains.

Description

The bark is pale greenish-grey and smooth on young trees with dark grey diamond-shaped lenticels, becoming dark grey and fissured on older trees.

The flat petiole allows them to tremble in even slight breezes, and is the source of its scientific name, as well as one of its vernacular names "langues de femmes" attributed to Gerard's 17th-century Herball. The leaves on seedlings and fast-growing stems of suckers (root sprouts) are of a different shape, heart-shaped to nearly triangular.

The flowers are wind-pollinated catkins produced in early spring before the new leaves appear; they are dioecious, with male and female catkins on different trees. The fluff assists wind dispersal of the seeds when the capsules split open at maturity.

It can be distinguished from the closely related North American Populus tremuloides by the leaves being more coarsely toothed.

Like other aspens, it spreads extensively by suckers (root sprouts), which may be produced up to 40 m from the parent tree, forming extensive clonal colonies. This often makes the job of clearing unwanted trees from an area especially difficult, as new suckers will continue to sprout from the extensive root system for up to several years after all surface growth has been eliminated.

Ecology

Eurasian aspen is a water and light demanding species that is able to vigorously colonize an open area after fire, clear cutting or other kind of damages. After an individual has been damaged or destroyed, root suckers are produced abundantly on the shallow lateral roots. Fast growth continues until the age of about 20 years when crown competition increases. After that, growth speed decreases and culminates at about 30 years of age. Aspen can reach an age of 200 years.

It is a very hardy species and tolerates long, cold winters and short summers.

Aspen is resistant to browsing pressure by fallow deer due to its unpleasant taste.

This species is important for the hornet moth, which uses it as a host during the larval stage.

Fossil record
Fossils of Populus tremula have been described from the fossil flora of Kızılcahamam district in Turkey which is of early Pliocene age.

Cultivation
The aspen is found in cultivation in parks and large gardens. The fastigiate cultivar ‘Erecta’, with bright yellow autumn colouring, has gained the Royal Horticultural Society’s Award of Garden Merit. The cultivar is colloquially known as "Swedish columnar" in Canada and the United States.

The hybrid with Populus alba (white poplar), known as grey poplar, Populus × canescens, is widely found in Europe and central Asia. Hybrids with several other aspens have also been bred at forestry research institutes in order to find trees with greater timber production and disease resistance (e.g. P. tremula × P. tremuloides, bred in Denmark).

Use
The wood of aspen is light and soft with very little shrinkage. It is used for lumber and matches but is also valued in the pulp and paper industry, being particularly useful for writing paper. In addition, it is used for plywood and different types of flake and particle boards. Given its hardiness and capacity for rapid growth and regeneration, it plays an important role in the production of wood for renewable energy. Ecologically, the species is important as many insect and fungi species benefit from it. The tree further provides habitat for several mammals and birds that require young forests.

References

External links

 Video, commentary and annotation on why Aspen leaves tremble.
 Populus tremula - distribution map, genetic conservation units and related resources. European Forest Genetic Resources Programme (EUFORGEN)
 Populus tremula - Aspen; info, images and video at Woodland Trust
 

tremula
Flora of temperate Asia
Flora of Europe
Flora of Algeria
Trees of continental subarctic climate
Trees of humid continental climate
Trees of subpolar oceanic climate
Plants described in 1753
Taxa named by Carl Linnaeus